Patrik Åström (born 28 August 1987) is a Swedish football player who plays as a midfielder for Hittarps IK. He has also played for Landskrona BoIS between 2010-2013.
Prior to signing for BoIS, he played for the local rivals Helsingborgs IF and Ängelholms FF.

References

External links

1987 births
Living people
Swedish footballers
Allsvenskan players
Helsingborgs IF players
Landskrona BoIS players
Ängelholms FF players
Trelleborgs FF players
Association football forwards
Sportspeople from Helsingborg